John Clegg may refer to:
 John Clegg (violinist) (1714–?), Irish violinist
 John Clegg (actor) (born 1934), English actor
 John Clegg (archaeologist) (1935–2015), Australian archaeologist
 John Clegg (footballer) (1939–2011), Australian footballer

See also
 Johnny Clegg (born 1953), South African musician and anthropologist
 Jon Clegg (born 1970), British comedian
 Jono Clegg (born 1989), British rower